Euchromia hampsoni is a species of moth in the  subfamily Arctiinae. It is found in Ghana and Sierra Leone.

References

Moths described in 1926
Euchromiina